The men's Greco-Roman heavyweight competition at the 1936 Summer Olympics in Berlin took place from 6 August to 9 August at the Deutschlandhalle. Nations were limited to one competitor. This weight class allowed wrestlers weighing over 87kg.

This Greco-Roman wrestling competition continued to use the "bad points" elimination system introduced at the 1928 Summer Olympics, with a slight modification. Each round featured all wrestlers pairing off and wrestling one bout (with one wrestler having a bye if there were an odd number). The loser received 3 points if the loss was by fall or unanimous decision and 2 points if the decision was 2-1 (this was the modification from prior years, where all losses were 3 points). The winner received 1 point if the win was by decision and 0 points if the win was by fall. At the end of each round, any wrestler with at least 5 points was eliminated.

Schedule

Results

Round 1

Of the six bouts, five were won by fall giving the winners 0 points and the losers 3 points. The remaining bout was a split decision, giving Donati 1 point for winning and Çoban 2 points for losing.

 Bouts

 Points

Round 2

Four of the first round winners won again, with two finishing the second round at 0 points and two finishing the round at 1 point. Four of the first round losers lost again and were eliminated. Çoban, the loser of the split decision in the first round, won by fall to stay at 2 points. Donati, the winner of that first-round decision, fell to 4 points after losing in the second round. The remaining two men had 3 points after the round.

 Bouts

 Points

Round 3

The two 0-point wrestlers faced each other; Palusalu won by decision, so both received their first points (1 for Palusalu, 3 for Nyman). Çoban beat Nyström in a split decision, which resulted in both finishing the round at 3 points. Hornfischer received his second point in a win by decision over Zvejnieks, who was eliminated with the second loss. Klapuch arrived late, being eliminated by losing by default to Donati (who, at 4 points going into the round, needed the 0 to stay in contention).

 Bouts

 Points

Round 4

This round eliminated half of the remaining wrestlers, with each bout's loser going over 5 points. Palusalu and Hornfischer ended the round with 2 points, Nyman with 3. The official report lists Çoban as 4th and Nyström as 5th.

 Bouts

 Points

Round 5

Palusalu's win ended the competition, eliminating Hornfischer. Palusalu had previously defeated Nyman, so any win for Palusalu in this round would secure the gold. Hornfischer had not faced Nyman, so a Hornfischer win here would have set up that match as a final round (with Palusalu still eligible for silver or even gold if the loss to Hornfischer had been by split decision).

 Bouts

 Points

References

Wrestling at the 1936 Summer Olympics